Jeffrey E. Barlough (born 1953 in Los Angeles, California) is a trained biologist and veterinarian with a Ph.D. in Virology from Cornell University who has published over 60 research and review articles in scientific journals since 1979. He is also an armchair historian and has edited small press publications of minor and archaic English works.

He is also the author of several dark fantasy novels that comprise his Western Lights series, set in an alternate world in which the last ice age never ended. Then, in the year 1839, a catastrophic event known as "the sundering" (its cause unknown at the time) wiped out most of the Earth's population and plunged the world into an even deeper Ice Age. By an accident of geography, only a narrow North American coastline (from what is now lower British Columbia to approximately San Diego) of civilization survives, where Victorian society exists alongside prehistoric beasts. The books are written in a style reminiscent of 19th century authors that has often been referred to Charles Dickens mixed with H. P. Lovecraft. His stories portray eccentric and (mostly) likable characters set within detailed locations that, on the surface, seem mundane and sometimes even cheery, but sinister plots and presences are slowly and carefully revealed.

Bibliography

Western Lights novels
 Dark Sleeper (1998, first trade edition 2000)
 The House in the High Wood: A Story of Old Talbotshire (2001)
 Strange Cargo (2004)
 Bertram of Butter Cross (2007)
 Anchorwick (2008)
 A Tangle in Slops (2011)
 What I Found at Hoole (2012)
 The Cobbler of Ridingham (2014)
 Where the Time Goes (2016)
 The Thing in the Close (2018)
 Hooting Grange (2021)
 Rose of Picardy (in preparation)

Medical books
 Manual of Small Animal Infectious Diseases (Editor) (1988)
 UC Davis Book of Dogs: The Complete Medical Reference Guide for Dogs and Puppies (Editor, with Mordecai Siegal) (1995)
 UC Davis Book of Horses: A Complete Medical Reference Guide for Horses and Foals (Editor, with Mordecai Siegal and Victoria Blankenship Siegal) (1996)

External links
 Official Website of the Western Lights Series
 
 Academic article listings on the UC Davis School of Veterinary Medicine website
 Academic article listings on Google Scholar
 Pictures of Jeffrey E. Barlough from the UC Davis School of Veterinary Medicine website

Cornell University alumni
1953 births
Living people
American virologists
American veterinarians
Male veterinarians